Dastan Ensemble is an Iranian classical music ensemble. Founded in 1991 by Hamid Motabassem, Dastan has performed concerts throughout the world.

Members
Hossein Behroozinia (Barbat)
Hamid Motebassem (Tar and Setar)
Pejman Hadadi (Percussion)
Saeed Farajpouri (Kamancheh)
Behnam Samani (Percussion)

Former members
Sima Bina
Shahram Nazeri
Iraj Bastami
Kayhan Kalhor
Homayoun Shajarian
Parissa
Salar Aghili
Pouya Saraei (Santour)
Sadigh Tarif
Mahdieh Mohammadkhani
Arjang Ataollahi

References

External links

Official website
Photos from Dastan Ensemble concert in California, BBC

Persian classical music groups